William Bartholomew Giles Egan (December 3, 1824 – November 28, 1878) was a justice of the Louisiana Supreme Court from January 9, 1877, to November 29, 1878.

Born in Amelia County, Virginia, Egan graduated from Emory and Henry College in 1845,  and gained admission to the bar shortly thereafter. He and his family moved to North Louisiana, where Egan "soon acquired a large practice in the Claiborne district".

In 1857, Egan was elected as a district judge, defeating a popular opponent. He was twice reelected, and after completing his final term returned to private practice. In 1877, Governor Francis T. Nicholls offered Egan an appointment to the state supreme court, which Egan accepted. Egan remained on the court until his death. Egan died in New Orleans, following a rapid decline in health, having previously improved from a period of poor health the previous summer. He was interred at Oakland Cemetery in Shreveport.

References

1824 births
1878 deaths
People from Amelia County, Virginia
Emory and Henry College alumni
Justices of the Louisiana Supreme Court